General elections were held in American Samoa on 4 November 2014, alongside a constitutional referendum. Voters elected members of the Fono and the American Samoan delegate to the United States Congress.

Results

Fono

Delegate

References

2014 elections in Oceania
 
Elections in American Samoa
2014
2014 United States House of Representatives elections
November 2014 events in Oceania